The National Day of Listening is an unofficial day of observance where Americans are encouraged to set aside time to record the stories of their families, friends, and local communities. It was first launched by the national oral history project StoryCorps in 2008 and now recurs on the Friday after Thanksgiving Day, when families are more likely to spend time together. It was proposed as an alternative to "Black Friday", a day many businesses see as a high volume pre-Christmas sale day.

Tens of thousands of Americans interviewed one another as part of the National Day of Listening in 2008 , including President George W. Bush and his wife Laura, who were interviewed by President Bush's sister Dorothy Bush Koch. National Public Radio personalities including Scott Simon, Liane Hansen, Steve Inskeep, Renée Montagne, Frank Deford, Susan Stamberg, and Noah Adams also conducted National Day of Listening interviews and broadcast them on the air. 

There are no restrictions on who may conduct an interview as part of the National Day of Listening or what type of interview format may be used. StoryCorps provides Do-It-Yourself Resources and equipment recommendations to guide people through the interview process. guides are available to help teachers and librarians to incorporate The National Day of Listening into the classroom and library.

StoryCorps is a national nonprofit organization modeled after the Federal Writers' Project of the Works Progress Administration of the 1930s. In addition to collecting and archiving interviews at the American Folklife Center at the Library of Congress, StoryCorps helps Americans engage with oral histories at the grassroots level. 

StoryCorps' first book, Listening Is an Act of Love: A Celebration of American Life from the StoryCorps Project, was released in 2007.

External links 
 Do-It-Yourself Resources
 USA Today article about the National Day of Listening
Boston Globe article about the National Day of Listening

Oral history
Listening
Observances based on the date of Thanksgiving (United States)